The 1966 Brown Bears football team was an American football team that represented Brown University during the 1966 NCAA University Division football season. Brown finished last in the Ivy League. 

In their eighth and final season under head coach John McLaughry, the Bears compiled a 1–8 record and were outscored 266 to 137. Terry Boyle and Wynn Jessup were the team captains. 

The Bears' 0–7 conference record placed last in the Ivy League standings. They were outscored by Ivy opponents 204 to 80. 

Brown played its home games at Brown Stadium in Providence, Rhode Island.

Schedule

References

Brown
Brown Bears football seasons
Brown Bears football